The 2006 Stanford Cardinal football team represented Stanford University in the 2006 NCAA Division I FBS football season. In head coach Walt Harris's second season at Stanford, the Cardinal won only one game, ending the season with a 1–11 record, the school's worst since a winless 1960 season. Harris was fired on December 4, 2006, two days after Stanford's regular season ended.  By the end of his tenure at Stanford, Harris had surpassed Jack Curtice with the lowest winning percentage in the history of Stanford football, with a 26.1% win record.

The team played their home games at the newly renovated Stanford Stadium in Stanford, California and competed in the Pacific-10 Conference.

Schedule

Coaches

Game summaries

Oregon

San Jose State

Navy

Washington State

UCLA

Notre Dame

Arizona

Arizona State

USC

Washington

Oregon State

California

References

Stanford
Stanford Cardinal football seasons
Stanford Cardinal football